"Dac-am plecat, Ardealule, din tine" is a Romanian patriotic song. It is also simply known as "Ardealul". It appeared after the cession of Northern Transylvania to Hungary in 1940. At the time, Romania was also forced to give up Bessarabia, Northern Bukovina and the Hertsa region to the Soviet Union, as well as Southern Dobruja to Bulgaria. The Second Vienna Award of 30 August, which caused the loss of Northern Transylvania, caused great consternation among the Romanian public. Its author is unknown, although it is thought to have been a contemporary soldier.

It is recorded that demobilized soldiers from Northern Transylvania went to Șiria and sung the first stanza of the song. Here, it quickly became popular among the inhabitants. It was also sung in 1944 during the Budapest Offensive when Romanian troops attacked Hungary to recover the region.

Nowadays, it can be found in the repertoire of the Romanian Army Choir or the male choir of the village of Finteușu Mare. From the latter, the folk singer Veta Biriș took the song and added it to her repertoire, with different lyrics written by a collaborator of her. These refer to the emigration of Romanians abroad since 1989. Another folk singer who has made his own version is Felix Gălan. Furthermore, it is a song used by legionnaires in the country.

Lyrics
The lyrics of the original version (and their English translation) are the following:

References

External links
 

Romanian patriotic songs
1940 songs
Anti-Hungarian sentiment
Songs of World War II
Romanian-language songs